Spremberg is a municipality near the Saxon city of Hoyerswerda and is in the Spree-Neiße district of Brandenburg, Germany.

First mentioned in 1301, the town alone has 14,028 inhabitants, and the municipality, including other villages, has 22,456 inhabitants, as of 31 December 2017.

Geography
Spremberg is situated about 20 km south of Cottbus and 25 km north of Hoyerswerda, on an island and on both banks of the river Spree. Between 1871 and 1918 the town was the geographical centre of the German Empire: today, it is only 25 km from the German-Polish border. On 1 January 2016, the former municipality Hornow-Wadelsdorf became part of Spremberg.

Demography

Mayors
 Friedrich Nath (1908–1919)
 Paul Steffen (1920–1931)
 Richard Buder (1931–1933)
 Kurt Kaulbars (1933–1945) NSDAP
 Rudolf Otto (1944–1945) temporary
 August Scholta (1945–1945) temporary
 Richard Buder (1945–1946)
 Willi Lange (1946–1953)
 Ruth Kartschall (1953–1961)
 Herbert Köhler (1961–1965)
 Günter Frenzel (1965–1975)
 Lothar Barnowski (1975–1975) temporary
 Hannelore Neumann (1975–1990) SED
 Egon Wochatz (1990–2002) CDU
 Klaus-Peter Schulze (2002–2013) CDU
 Christine Schönherr (2013–2013) temporary, independent
 Frank Kulik (2014–2014) temporary, independent
 Christine Herntier (since 2014), independent

Culture
In 1911 there were Roman Catholic and two Protestant churches and a pilgrimage chapel dating from 1100, there was a ducal chateau built by a son of the elector John George around the end of the 16th century (now used as government offices), and there were classical, technical and commercial schools as well as a hospital.

Schwarze Pumpe

Schwarze Pumpe is a district of Spremberg, lying approximately 7 km southwest of Spremberg's town centre on the federal state boundary between Brandenburg to Saxony. It had 1886 inhabitants as of 31 December 2017. A large industrial area extending into Saxony and including the site of a large power plant is known by the same name.

On 26 May 2006, construction work started on the world's first -free coal power plant in the Schwarze Pumpe industrial district. The plant is based on a concept called carbon capture and storage, which means that carbon emissions will be captured and compressed to th their original volume, liquefying the gas. It will then be forced 1,000 metres (3,300 ft) below the soil into porous rock where it is believed that it will remain for thousands of years without exacerbating global warming. The project, which has cost some 70 million Euros, was funded entirely by the Swedish company Vattenfall AB and went into service on 9 September 2008. The power plant was a pilot project to serve as a prototype for future full-scale power plants. Vattenfall stopped carbon capture R&D at the plant in 2014 because they found that "its costs and the energy it requires make the technology unviable".

Twin towns – sister cities

Spremberg is twinned with:
 Grand Forks, Canada
 Szprotawa, Poland
 Zheleznogorsk, Russia

Notable people
Johann Agricola (1530–1590), Protestant theologian
Otto Ostrowski (1883–1963), politician (SPD), Lord Mayor of Berlin 1946/1947
Erwin Strittmatter (1912–1994), writer
Joachim Teege (1925–1969), actor and cabaret artist
Dirk Meier (born 1964), cyclist
Sebastian Piersig (born 1984), slalom-canoeist

References

External links

 
Populated places in Spree-Neiße